Laddenvean is a small settlement in southwest Cornwall, England, United Kingdom.

The name Laddenvean comes from the Cornish language Ladnvian, which contains the elements ladn 'enclosure' and vian 'little'.

References

Villages in Cornwall
St Keverne